Fernando Darío Ferreyra (born 19 January 1997) is an Argentine professional footballer who plays as a right-back for Bosnian Premier League club Velež Mostar.

Career
Ferreyra is a product of the Boca Juniors academy. However, after failing to make a breakthrough at first-team level, Ferreyra left for Bosnian football with, at the time, First League of FBiH team Velež Mostar in early 2018. He played in the remaining months of the 2017–18 season, though injuries affected his impact. Ferreyra made twenty-six appearances, all as a starter, and netted one in 2018–19 as Velež were promoted as champions to the Premier League. His top-flight debut arrived on 20 July 2019 versus Mladost Doboj Kakanj.

Career statistics

Honours
Velež Mostar
First League of FBiH: 2018–19

Notes

References

External links

1997 births
Living people
Footballers from Buenos Aires
Argentine footballers
Association football defenders
Argentine expatriate footballers
Expatriate footballers in Bosnia and Herzegovina
Argentine expatriate sportspeople in Bosnia and Herzegovina
First League of the Federation of Bosnia and Herzegovina players
Premier League of Bosnia and Herzegovina players
FK Velež Mostar players